Lars Brygmann (born 17 February 1957) is a Danish actor. He graduated from acting school in 1987 and went on to perform in a number of theatres in Denmark. His television and film debut came in 1995. He is the brother of actors Martin and Jens Brygmann.

Selected filmography

Film

Television

External links

 

Danish male film actors
Danish male stage actors
Danish male television actors
Male actors from Copenhagen
1957 births
Living people